Elio Juárez (born 18 April 1942) is a former Uruguayan cyclist. He competed in the team pursuit event at the 1964 Summer Olympics.

References

External links
 

1942 births
Living people
Uruguayan male cyclists
Olympic cyclists of Uruguay
Cyclists at the 1964 Summer Olympics
Place of birth missing (living people)